Richard Bernstein may refer to:

*Richard Bernstein (journalist) (born 1944), American columnist for the New York Times
Richard B. Bernstein (born 1956), American constitutional historian and CCNY lecturer in law and political science
Richard Barry Bernstein (1923–1990), American chemist
Richard H. Bernstein (born 1974), American lawyer and Michigan supreme court justice; first blind supreme court justice in the United States
Richard K. Bernstein (born 1934), American physician
Richard J. Bernstein (1932–2022), American philosopher
Richard Bernstein (artist) (1939–2002), American artist, illustrated covers of Interview magazine
Richard Bernstein (bass) (born 1966), American opera singer at the Metropolitan Opera